Globensky or Globenski is a Polish masculine surname, its feminine counterpart is Globenska. It may refer to
Allan Globensky (born 1951), Canadian ice hockey player 
August Franz Globensky (born Głąbiński; 1754–1830), Polish physician
Charles-Auguste-Maximilien Globensky (1830–1906), Canadian writer and politician, son of Maximilien
Hortense Globensky-Prévost (1804–1873), Canadian heroine
Maximilien Globensky (1793–1866), French-Canadian soldier, son of August Franz

See also
Głąbiński

Polish-language surnames